Fazal Elahi (death 24 March 1948) was a Pakistani politician who served as the 1st Deputy Speaker of the Provincial Assembly of the Punjab between 1948 and 1949.

He was to born in Daska to Christianity practicing family and was nominated by Muhammad Ali Jinnah.

References

1948 deaths
Punjab, Pakistan MLAs 1947–1949
Pakistani Christians
Deputy Speakers of the Provincial Assembly of the Punjab